Wynjones Mathew Kisamba (born 5 March 1953) is a Tanzanian retired Lieutenant General and diplomat.

He served as the Deputy Force Commander of the African Union – United Nations Hybrid Operation in Darfur (UNAMID).

Honours

References

External links
Presenting credentials to President Putin

1953 births
Living people
Tanzanian generals
Ambassadors of Tanzania to Russia